Sohnreyia excelsa, synonym Spathelia excelsa, commonly called the maypole tree, is one of a genus  of palmoid trees, or Corner Model Trees, (architecturally palm-like in gross form) belonging to the Citrus, or Rue  family (Rutaceae). It is native to the rainforests of the  Amazon basin, and was discovered in 1911 by botanical explorer Dr. Ernst H.G. Ule.

References

Rutaceae
Flora of the Amazon